Christopher Francis Pope  (born 30 September 1952) is a former South African rugby union player.

Playing career
Pope matriculated at Rondebosch Boys' High School in Cape Town and attended the University of Cape Town for a medical degree. He made his provincial debut for Western Province in 1972 against Northern Transvaal at Loftus Versfeld. In 1976, Pope scored the winning try for Western Province during their 12–11 victory over the touring All Blacks.

Pope made his test debut for the Springboks against the 1974 British Lions at Newlands in Cape Town and was the only backline player to play in all four tests during the series against the Lions. At the end of 1974 Pope toured with the Springboks to France without playing in any tests and then played in five more tests, two against France and three against the All Blacks.  He also played in four tour matches for the Springboks.

Test history

See also
List of South Africa national rugby union players – Springbok no. 461

References

1952 births
Living people
South African rugby union players
South Africa international rugby union players
Western Province (rugby union) players
Alumni of Rondebosch Boys' High School
University of Cape Town alumni
People from Stellenbosch
Rugby union players from the Western Cape
Rugby union wings